Mirjeta Shala (born 12 February 1994) is a Kosovan television presenter, model and beauty pageant titleholder who was crowned Miss Kosovo 2013 and was to compete in Miss Universe 2013 before Kosovo withdrew from the pageant. In November 2013, she signed a contract with Trump Model Management.

Personal life
Shala is a student of Economic and Marketing Business Administration at Universiteti AAB-Riinvest.

Miss Universe Kosovo 2013
Shala was crowned Miss Kosova 2013 (Miss Universe Kosovo 2013) and was to represent Kosovo at Miss Universe 2013 in Moscow, Russia. She won the Miss Universe Kosovo competition on 17 August 2013 held in the capital, Prishtina but did not compete. However, in October the Miss Universe Kosovo Organization withdrew from the Miss Universe pageant as since Russia does not recognize Kosovo as an independent nation, they do not accept Kosovar passports and Shala would not have been allowed into the country.

Appointment
On 18 October 2015 it was announced that the Miss Universe Kosovo pageant is cancelled for 2015 and that the next Miss Universe Kosovo pageant will be in 2016. Later, on the Miss Universe Kosovo Organization Facebook, it was announced that Shala was appointed to represent Kosovo at the Miss Universe 2015 pageant in the USA. She competed in the pageant on 20 December 2015 but did not place.

References

External links
Official Miss Kosovo website

Kosovo Albanians
Living people
Miss Universe 2015 contestants
Kosovan beauty pageant winners
1994 births
People from Vushtrri